Redfern-Keily Provincial Park was a provincial park in British Columbia, Canada.

It was established in the Muskwa Ranges of the northern Rockies, along the Besa River and its tributaries. It was named after William (Bill) Keily (born in January 1878 in Valcartier Village, Quebec). Kelly was a trapper, photographer, and Wilderness Guide in the area.

The centre piece of the park was the Redfern Lake, formed on the course of the Besa River. Glaciers such as the Ithaca Glacier and Achaean Glacier were also protected by this park.

The park was part of the larger Muskwa-Kechika Management Area.

References

External links

Peace River Regional District
Provincial parks of British Columbia
1999 establishments in British Columbia
Protected areas established in 1999